Andrés Venegas García (December 30, 1848 – November 9, 1939) was a Costa Rican politician.

Vice presidents of Costa Rica
1848 births
1939 deaths
Foreign ministers of Costa Rica